New York is a 2009 Indian Hindi-language thriller film directed by Kabir Khan and produced by Aditya Chopra, based on a script by lyricist Sandeep Shrivastava and a story by Chopra, with Visual Computing Labs, Tata Elxsi Ltd. handling the visual effects. The film stars John Abraham, Katrina Kaif, Neil Nitin Mukesh, Irrfan Khan and Nawazuddin Siddiqui in lead roles. Shot simultaneously in Hindi and English, the film tells a story about 3 friends studying at the fictional New York State University whose lives are changed by the September 11 attacks and its aftermath.

New York released on 26 June 2009, and proved to be a commercial success, grossing ₹81.21 crore worldwide, and was the sixth-highest grossing Hindi film of 2009. It received highly positive reviews from critics upon release, with praise for its direction, screenplay and performances of the cast, with particular praise directed towards Kaif and Nitin Mukesh's performances.

At the 55th Filmfare Awards, New York received 2 nominations – Best Actress (Kaif) and Best Supporting Actor (Mukesh).

Plot 
In the United States in 2009, the FBI arrest Omar Aijaz, a young Muslim man originally from Delhi, India, after finding guns in the trunk of a taxi cab he owned. Omar is then taken into custody and interrogated by FBI Agent Roshan, also a Muslim man originally from South Asia who has been living in the United States for twenty years. Omar then discovers that he was set up by the FBI to force him to spy on a former college friend, Terrorist Sameer "Sam" Sheikh, whom he has not seen in seven years and who the FBI believes is a terrorist. In the process, Omar discovers that Sam has married Maya, a mutual friend whom Omar had a crush on in university and finds out that Sam and Maya have a young son, Danyal.

Roshan orders Omar to tell him everything he knows about Sam. The film then flashes back to September 1999, when Omar begins his studies at the New York State University. He is befriended by his international student counselor Maya and learns that though she was born and raised in New York, she is fluent in Hindi because of her mother's interest in Bollywood films. Omar also meets Sam, an American Muslim who is also fluent in Hindi due to the fact that his father is a professor of Indian studies. Over the next two years, all three become inseparable friends and gradually Omar falls in love with Maya. When Omar realises that she loves Sam, however, he distances himself from them both. Their carefree days end with the onset of the September 11 attacks, or 9/11.

After finishing his story, Omar agrees to help Roshan (rather reluctantly), if only to prove that both he and Sam are innocent. He reunites with Maya and Terrorist Sam and stays in their house, all the while spying for the FBI. Omar learns that Maya is a civil rights activist who is helping one of Sam's employees, Zilgai overcome his experience as a former 9/11 detainee. Zilgai was eventually released due to lack of evidence and has been having difficulty adjusting back to normal life.

As time progresses, Omar feels satisfied that he can find nothing to warrant the FBI's suspicions and is ready to leave when a series of events forces him to reconsider. In the process, Omar learns from Sam that ten days after 9/11, Sam was arrested and detained for a period of nine months as a suspected terrorist, a charge which everyone, including the FBI and Roshan, now agree was incorrect. Though he was eventually released due to lack of evidence, the impact of being detained and tortured permanently changed Sam in ways which are difficult for those surrounding him to understand, leaving him with feelings of deep resentment towards the FBI. Omar thus finds that Sam ultimately resorted to plans for terrorism as a means of revenge.

In addition, Maya is unable to help Zilgai resolve the trauma of being a detainee. After a routine traffic stop escalates and an NYPD police officer gives Maya a very rough full-body search, Zilgai becomes agitated. He drops Maya at her home and eventually kills the police officer the same night. After being declared a fugitive, Zilgai leads the police on a long chase ultimately ending in his suicide.

The climax of the film rests upon the attempts of Maya, Omar, and Roshan to prevent Sam from committing an act of terrorism by telling him that if he perpetuates towards terrorism, others will suffer as he has. Finally convinced, Sam surrenders and aborts his attempt to bomb the FBI building. However, the moment he drops his cell-phone (which was originally intended as a detonator for the bomb) he is shot and killed by FBI snipers. The cell phone falls benign to the ground without activating anything. Maya, who was running toward Sam, is also killed by stray gunfire and Omar, bereft of speech, breaks down.

Six months later, Omar has adopted Danyal, and Roshan has received commendation for aiding in the anti-terrorism cause. Omar is comforted by Roshan who explains to him that everybody was right in their place, but the timing was wrong. As for Sam, the path he chose killed him. Everybody has moved on after 9/11, as it's high time. Roshan explains to Omar that both Sam and Maya will always be alive in Omar’s good memories and in his heart. Their friendship will always be alive because of the good memories that they had spent together. They reconcile with each other. The film ends with all three of them going out for pasta and a side note describing the after-effects of 9/11.

Cast
 John Abraham as Sameer "Sam" Sheikh
Katrina Kaif as Maya Sheikh  
 Neil Nitin Mukesh as Omar Aijaz
 Irrfan Khan as FBI Agent Roshan
 Nawazuddin Siddiqui as Zilgai
  Aidan Wagner as Danyal Sheikh – Maya and Sameer's Son
 Ali Quli Mirza as Zaheer
 Samrat Chakrabarti as Yakub

Themes 
New York explores the aftermath of 9/11. In a June 2009 interview with the Indo-Asian News Service (IANS), director Kabir Khan argued that the film "is based on part of the political canvas of 9/11, but it speaks of prejudices after the great human tragedy. It is a definite and very relevant subject about post-9/11 prejudices that have increased after the attacks [...] We have in fact divided time in a pre- and post-9/11 world in the film to highlight its obvious repercussions in times to come. The repercussions of the attacks are still very strongly felt globally and will continue to do so." Khan continued to state that the film had the full support of the New York Film Commission, " as it is not an anti-something film. It is a very balanced story and not a jingoistic film." In a separate interview with IANS, actor John Abraham argued that, "in its own strange way, New York begins where Pakistani film Khuda Ke Liye ended. That's the interesting part of the film [...] Each director has his own way of interpreting and researching the plight of legal detainees." Abraham continued by suggesting that this is why Khan and Shoaib Mansoor offer different interpretations of these events in their respective films. The plot of New York is similar to ''The Greater Good'', the twenty-first episode of the first season of ABC TV series Lost.

Production
Production began in September 2008 and filming lasted over a period of 100 days. Most of the shoot took place in New York although some of the scenes which took place in New York were actually shot in Philadelphia. New York is the first Hindi film to have a production schedule there. In preparation for his role as an American Muslim of Indian origin, Abraham studied the Quran. Khan had to submit his script for approval from U.S. authorities before making the film. He stated: "We had to submit the script to seek permission to shoot in Guantanamo as well as in the States and we got their green signal to go ahead very easily. The film may be about 9/11 and what happens post it, but they did not object to our theme and did not even raise any questions. The US officials were very cooperative and we shot for around 3 days at this high-profile prison."

Soundtrack 

The soundtrack of New York was released on 10 June 2009. The songs and the theme featured in the soundtrack are composed by Pritam Chakraborty, Julius Packiam and Pankaj Awasthi and the lyrics are penned by Sandeep Shrivastava and Junaid Wasi. Packiam composed the film score. The remix version of "Hai Junoon" used in the end credits of the film is sung by K.K. and Monali Thakur and not available in the original soundtrack.

Release

Box office
New York grossed a record Rs. 35 million during its first 3 days in India, with theatres at their highest occupancy since January at 80–85%. During its first week, it ranked #1 at the box office in India and grossed Rs. 618.9 million worldwide, and was declared a hit. Its total gross in India after a 6-week run was Rs. .

New York'''s opening weekend was highly successful in India and the Middle East. It also proved popular in Australia and did well in the UK and U.S. Of its opening in India, Khan commented: "I always believed that New York will be a word-of-mouth film which would open on a decent note and then show an increase in business with every passing day. When I was told by friends and people from industry that it had opened to a housefull response in the very first show at so many places across the country, even I was taken aback." It became the sixth highest-grossing film of 2009, grossing Rs. .

Critical ReceptionNew York received highly positive reviews from critics upon release.

Subhash K. Jha gave New York a rave review arguing that New York "is what cinema in contemporary times should be, must be, though it seldom is" and designates it  "an important film" which "cares about the prejudices that have taken over the world. Jha also states that, "stereotypical portrayals of the cultural diaspora are fortunately rare in this piece of contemporary art which has plenty of heart, a heart that never overflows in an embarrassing torrent of emotions." Devansh Patel, film critic for London's Hounslow Chronicle, gave New York 5 out of 5 stars stating that it is, "the most thought provoking movie Yash Raj Films has ever come up with." Nikhat Kazmi of the Times of India gave it 4 out of 5 stars, describing New York as, "an extremely taut and highly emotive piece of political drama [...] topical, meaningful, and entertaining, all at the same time." Taran Adarsh of Bollywood Hungama gave it four out of five stars arguing that New York is "one of the finest films produced by this premier production house, Yash Raj [...] the screenplay is its biggest star, without a doubt. Given the fact that New York isn't one of those routine masala fares, Kabir has injected songs only when required. Cinematography is striking." Joginder Tuteja of the Indo-Asian News Service (IANS) calls the film "a must-watch" and gave it 4 out of 4 stars. He states: "When a hardcore commercial flick gets a standing ovation and a huge round of applause at the end of the show, you know that there is something definitely right that the director has done. In this regard, Kabir Khan can take a bow because he has done exceedingly well in making a film that is not frivolous, has a message and still carries enough commercial ingredients to reach out to masses as well as classes." Jayant of the Hindustan Times argues that comparing New York "to Mark Pellington's Arlington Road would be grossly unfair. If anything, this is a much better movie than that 1999, part-spooky conspiracy theory. The central theme itself is closer to Shoaib Mansoor's Khuda Kay Liye (2007), and you can sense how the superior execution here makes all the filmmaking difference." Additionally, Shekhar describes New York in NDTV as, "an A-list film that gets a straight A." Sandhya Iyer of the Sakaal Times gave the film 3.5 out of 4 stars arguing that "New York manages to be gripping, thanks to an excellent screenplay. Most importantly, the story has the right mix of realism and drama – one that Kabir Khan unfolds with quiet confidence." Mathures Paul of The Statesman states: "Finally, here's a film that entertains and makes viewers think."

High profile screeningsNew York was the opening film for the 33rd Cairo International Film Festival on 10 November 2009. The film's director, Kabir Khan, was in attendance and addressed the audience at the end of its screening. New York was also screened at the Pusan International Film Festival in October 2009. Yash Chopra of New York's Yash Raj Films won the Asian Filmmaker of the Year award.

Awards

Home Video
The DVD for New York was released on 8 August 2009. Joginder Tuteja of Bollywood Hungama gave the DVD four out of five stars. The DVD includes (but is not limited to) 2.5 hours of special features such as: "Making of the Film," "Deleted Scenes," "New York Special – Zoom TV,"
"The New Yorkers – CNN-IBN," and a number of music videos.

See also
List of cultural references to the September 11 attacksThe Reluctant Fundamentalist Khuda Kay Liye (2007) a Pakistani film related to the same.
 List of American films of 2009

References

Further reading

Bansal, Robin. "I was myself in New York: Katrina," Times of India, 21 June 2009.
Jamkhandikar, Shilpa. "Just A Minute With: John Abraham on 'New York'." Reuters, 20 June 2009.
Jha, Subhash K. "How did Kabir Khan marry Mini Mathur?," Times of India, 6 July 2009.
Khan, Kabir. "Identity Proof." Indian Express, 13 December 2009.
Parab, Kanika. "Bollywood Revisits 9–11." Huffington Post, 29 June 2009.
Patel, Devansh. ""New York is about America's attitude before and after 9/11" – Irrfan Khan," Bollywood Hungama, 18 June 2009.
Press Trust of India. "Neil's "reality check" in New York before film's shoot," Deccan Herald, 20 June 2009.
Syed, Aijaz Zaka. "New York, the Untold Story ." Khaleej Times, 29 July 2009.
Zaman, Rana Siddiqui. "." The Hindu'', 29 June 2009.

External links
 
 
 
 
 

2009 films
2000s spy thriller films
Indian spy thriller films
Films shot in New York City
Films shot in Philadelphia
Films based on the September 11 attacks
Films set in the United States
Films shot in the United States
Films featuring songs by Pritam
Films directed by Kabir Khan
2000s vigilante films
20th Century Fox films
Films about terrorism in the United States
Films about the Federal Bureau of Investigation
Films about the New York City Police Department
Fictional portrayals of the New York City Police Department
2000s Hindi-language films